Fort Namaqua, some of its other names are Mariano's Crossing and Namaqua Station, was a trading post from 1858 or 1859. It was located in the present-day city of Loveland, Colorado in Larimer County, Colorado. In 1862, it became a stage station for travelers along the foothills to Denver. A fort was built at the site after 60 horses were driven off the property. Modena also developed a small settlement with people from his hometown of Taos, New Mexico. The site was named Namaqua in 1868, with the establishment of a post office. Buildings were used until the 1920s and were later dismantled. A historical marker is located at Namaqua Park, near the site of the former fort and station.

History

Mariano Medina (also Modena), a scout from Taos, operated a stage station and trading post, one of the earliest businesses in the pre-state history of Colorado. It was located on the crossing of several trails, including the Texas and Overland Trails, the Denver and Laramie Trails, and branches off the South Platte, and old Oregon Trails.  Medina spoke Spanish and English, and likely spoke some French and Indian dialects, as his wife was Native American and there were French fur trappers in the area. The fort was located west of the present-day Namaqua Road and on the north side of the Big Thompson River, where Medina built and operated a toll bridge. 

The first permanent settler in the Big Thompson Valley, Medina had built log buildings and recruited people from his hometown of Taos to help build a settlement of 100 people at the trading post. Sixty of his horses were looted by Ute people in 1861. He followed the Utes for 25 miles and shot one of them as the remaining men fled. He then built a stone fort on the north side of the Big Thompson, with six gun ports. The walls were up to 20 inches thick and the roof was built with logs, sandstone slabs, and topped with a foot of earth. 

In 1862, the fort became a stage station for the Holladay Overland Stage company along the Cherokee Trail, specifically in this area between Laporte and Denver. It was officially named Namaqua in 1868 when a post office was established at the fort and station. He also operated a farm in the area, where he was buried in 1878. After the fort was no longer needed and abandoned, the stone building was converted to an ice house. Until the 1920s, the log buildings were continued to be used. They then fell into disrepair and were dismantled, except for Medina's cabin which was restored and preserved at the Loveland museum. Medina's grave was moved to Namaqua Park in 1960. A marker was placed in the park near the site of the former stage station.

References

Further reading

External links
 Fort Namaqua, Reporter-Herald
 Namaqua settlement, Reporter-Herald
 Historic marker, Namaqua Park

Namaqua
1859 establishments in Kansas Territory
Buildings and structures in Larimer County, Colorado